The 2005–06 Top 14 competition was the 107th French domestic rugby union club competition operated by the Ligue Nationale de Rugby (LNR) and the 1st using the name Top 14.  Previously the league was known as Top 16 but the restructuring of the league at the end of the 2004–05 season meant that it shrank from 16 to 14 clubs.  Toulon were the only promoted team having won the 2004–05 Pro D2.

During the season attendance records in the league were broken with 79,502 spectators attending the Round 9 clash between Stade Français and Toulouse at the Stade de France, shattering the attendance record for any regular league season game in France (not just rugby union). However, that record was short-lived when 79,604 spectators attended the Round 17 match between Stade Français and Biarritz Olympique.

The regular season finished in late May 2006, with Biarritz finishing at the top of the ladder. The semi-finals and final were contested in June, with Biarritz defeating Toulouse to claim back-to-back titles, and their fifth overall.  Two teams were relegated with newly promoted Toulon, who had easily the poorest record in top 14 with just 3 wins from 26 games, being the first to go down, followed by Pau who were much more competitive but not quite good enough to stay up, finishing 3 points from safety.  Both clubs would drop to the 2006–07 Pro D2.

Teams

Number of teams by regions

Table

Fixtures & Results

Round 1

Round 2

Round 3

Round 4

Round 5

Round 6

Round 7

Round 8

Round 9

Round 10

Round 11

Round 12

Round 13

Round 14

Round 15

Round 16

Round 17

Round 18

Round 19

Round 20

Round 21

Round 22

Round 23

Round 24

Round 25

Round 26

Knock-out stages

Semi-finals

Final

Leading scorers
 Note that points scorers includes tries as well as conversions, penalties and drop goals.

Top points scorers

Top try scorers

Attendances

 Attendances do not include the semi-finals or final as these are at neutral venues.

See also
 2005–06 Heineken Cup
 2005–06 Rugby Pro D2 season

Notes

References

External links
  Ligue Nationale de Rugby – Official website
 Top 14 on Planetrugby.com

Top 14 seasons
 
France